The Soviet locomotive class L (Russian: Л) was a Soviet main freight steam locomotive type. They were nicknamed "Swan."

Description
The L class 2-10-0 was the first Soviet locomotive to use Boxpok-type wheels, which were commonplace in steam locomotive design post-World War II. A casing between the dome and chimney covered a steam drier pipe.

History
It was designed and built by the Kolomna Locomotive Works shortly after World War II under supervision by L.C. Lebedyanski. It was originally designated Class P (for Pobeda, "victory"), but was redesignated Class L in honor of its designer.

In conjunction with the FD class 2-10-2, it was primarily used to haul mainline goods across the terrain of the Soviet Union. Over 4,000 L class locomotives were constructed from 1945-1955, and they operated with the Soviet Railways until 1975.

Today there are over 300 example of L class locomotives surviving in various states of repair in the former Soviet Union, constituting the single largest surviving class of locomotives in the world. Many are still in operating condition.

See also
 History of rail transport in Russia
 Russian Railway Museum, Saint Petersburg

References

L
2-10-0 locomotives
Freight locomotives
5 ft gauge locomotives
Railway locomotives introduced in 1945
1′E h2 locomotives